Swanson is a hamlet in Montrose Rural Municipality 315, Saskatchewan, Canada. The hamlet is located southwest of Saskatoon along Highway 45 along the Canadian National Railway, Delisle-Tichfield Junction stub.

Notable people

 Alfred Gleave, a Member of Parliament for Saskatoon—Biggar, Canada from 25 June 1968 to 9 May 1974. He was a farmer and grain grower, and became an outspoken agricultural advocate who resided in Swanson.

See also

 List of communities in Saskatchewan
 Hamlets of Saskatchewan

Montrose No. 315, Saskatchewan
Former villages in Saskatchewan
Unincorporated communities in Saskatchewan